Little Otter Creek is a stream in the U.S. state of West Virginia.

Little Otter Creek was named for the otters which once were abundant there.

See also
List of rivers of West Virginia

References

Rivers of Braxton County, West Virginia
Rivers of West Virginia